The 1954 NC State Wolfpack football team represented North Carolina State University during the 1954 college football season. The Wolfpack were led by first-year head coach Earle Edwards and played their home games at Riddick Stadium in Raleigh, North Carolina. They competed as members of the Atlantic Coast Conference in the league's second year of existence. The Wolfpack once again failed to pick up their first ACC win, finishing winless in conference play for the second consecutive year.

Schedule

References

NC State
NC State Wolfpack football seasons
NC State Wolfpack football